Poradah–Goalundo Ghat line is a broad-gauge railway of Bangladesh Railway. The line is maintained and operated by West Zone.

History
On 29 September 1862, the Eastern Bengal Railway inaugurated the railway line from Calcutta to Ranaghat. This line was extended and on 15 November 1862 and a 53.11 km broad gauge (1,676 mm) railway section was opened from Darshana to Jagati. Kushtia was a marginal station at that time, but in 1867, due to the erosion of the Padma, it was shifted to the banks of the Gorai river and the original Kushtia station was abandoned in the following year. A 75 km railway line from Kushtia to the inland river port of Goalundo on the banks of the Padma (below the confluence of the Padma and Jamuna River) was inaugurated on 1 January 1871.

Stations
Poradah Junction railway station
Jagati railway station
Kushtia Court railway station
Kushtia railway station
Choraikal railway station
Kumarkhali railway station
Khoksha railway station
Machpara railway station
Pangsha railway station
Kalukhali Junction railway station
Belgachi railway station
Surjanagar railway station
Rajbari railway station
Pachuria Junction railway station
Goalundo Bazar railway station
Goalundo Ghat railway station

References

5 ft 6 in gauge railways in Bangladesh
Railway lines opened in 1862